Expo 2020 was a World Expo hosted by Dubai, in the United Arab Emirates, from 1 October 2021 to 31 March 2022. Originally scheduled for 20 October 2020 to 10 April 2021, it was postponed due to the COVID-19 pandemic in the United Arab Emirates. Despite being postponed, organizers kept the name Expo 2020 for marketing and branding purposes. The event had recorded more than 24 million visits in its six months. The Bureau International des Expositions (BIE) general assembly in Paris named Dubai as the host on 27 November 2013.

Event site

The main site of Expo 2020 Dubai was a 438-hectare area (1083 acres) located between the cities of Dubai and Abu Dhabi, near Dubai's southern border with Abu Dhabi. The master plan, designed by the American firm HOK, was organized around a central plaza, entitled Al Wasl Plaza, enclosed by three large thematic districts. Each one was dedicated to one of the sub-themes of Expo 2020 – Opportunity, Mobility and Sustainability. The infrastructure of the 4.38 km2 Expo 2020 site was built by Orascom and BESIX. The site had an emergency centre which includes an isolation room, emergency care room, ambulances and helicopter services.

The site also featured the ROVE Expo 2020, which was the only hotel located at the site. The hotel featured 312 rooms and 19 suites with a rooftop pool and views of Al Wasl Plaza.

Opening ceremony
Expo 2020 officially opened on 30 September 2021. The ceremony featured performances by Italian tenor Andrea Bocelli ("The Prayer"); Emirati singer-composer Hussain Al Jassmi, Mayssa Karaa and Almas singing the Expo's theme song, "This Is Our Time"; British singer Ellie Goulding ("Anything Could Happen"); Beninese singer Angélique Kidjo and Saudi singer Mohammed Abdu (a duet of John Legend's "If You're Out There"); American singer Andra Day ("Rise Up"); and Chinese pianist Lang Lang, among others. The opening declaration was made by the ruler of Dubai Sheikh Mohammed bin Rashid Al Maktoum.

Closing ceremony
Expo 2020 officially closed on 31 March 2022. American artists Christina Aguilera, Yo-Yo Ma and Norah Jones, Filipino bands Rivermaya, Moonstar88 and Imago, and the Dutch DJ Tiësto were among those who performed on the final night of the exposition. The top officials of Expo 2025 host Osaka, Governor Hirofumi Yoshimura and Mayor Ichiro Matsui, attended at the end the Expo 2020 Dubai to promote the Osaka event internationally. There were also concerts from the Expo 2020 World String Ensemble and Italian pianist Eleonora Constantini who was the person behind the Flying Piano show at Expo 2020.

Anthems
 UAE-based children's choir, the all-women Firdaus Orchestra, conducted by Yasmina Sabbah – National Anthem of the United Arab Emirates.
TBC – BIE Anthem
 NHK Symphony Orchestra conducted by Tadaaki Otaka – National Anthem of Japan

After the closing ceremony, in the early hours of April 1, the 3 huge portals that served as the entrances to Expo 2020, were permanently closed by the Expo 2020 team.

Transportation

Getting to Expo 2020 

The Expo 2020 metro station connects the site to other localities in Dubai, along the Dubai Metro's Red Line directly to the entrance of the Dubai Exhibition Centre and Al Wasl Gate. Alternatively, Dedicated shuttle buses known as Expo Riders ferry people from all over Dubai to the Expo site and back. Shuttle buses and taxis from RTA also travel to the Expo site. The metro, taxi and buses are paid for with the RTA's Nol card while the Expo Rider buses are free. The Expo Rider buses stop at the arrival plazas of the 3 thematic districts in front of the 3 huge gates and a separate branch of Expo Rider buses transports people from the arrival plazas to the parking areas. Getting there by road is another option. People drive on the roads leading to the site and have to follow the signs to the designated parking areas..

Themes
The theme of the Expo was "Connecting Minds, Creating the Future". The expo also had three subthemes: opportunity, mobility and sustainability, each with its own pavilion. Mission Possible – The Opportunity Pavilion is designed by AGi Architects, Alif – The Mobility Pavilion by Foster and Partners, and Terra – The Sustainability Pavilion by Grimshaw Architects.

In 2021, it was announced that the three thematic pavilions would open for a limited time before the full opening of the expo. The Sustainability Pavilion Terra opened on 22 January 2021 until 10 April 2021.

The Programme for People and Planet (PPP) was also held as part of the Expo. The programme was organised around five key tracks – Build Bridges (cultural focus), Leave No One Behind (social development focus), Live in Balance (sustainability focus), Thrive Together (economic focus), and UAE Vision 2071. The Vision 2071 track focused on the UAE's long-term plans for its future.

Sustainability
In addition to Terra – The Sustainability Pavilion in the sustainability district, there was a Hammour House which explores coral reefs; a district stage that seats 300, and several national pavilions: Brazil's Walk through a waterfall, the Czech Republic's Water the desert, Singapore's Enter a rainforest, Germany's Wear cutting-edge devices, the UAE's Terra – The Sustainability Pavilion, and the Netherlands' Enter a miniature world pavilion.

Mobility
Alif – The Mobility Pavilion included the world's largest passenger lift (capable of transporting more than 160 people).

Opportunity
Mission Possible – The Opportunity Pavilion was designed by AGi Architects.

Pavilions

The following nations and organizations participated in Expo 2020:

Country pavilions

Partner pavilions

Organisation pavilions

Special pavilions

Mascots
There are 6 mascots: Salama, Rashid, Latifa, Alif, Opti and Terra. Rashid and Latifa are a 9- and 8-year-old brother and sister duo; Salama is a ghaf tree; and Alif, Opti and Terra are the respective guardian mascots for the mobility, opportunity and sustainability pavilions.

Partners
In order to raise awareness about smart recycling, Expo 2020 organized nationwide bus tours with the waste partner Dulsco. L'Oréal was the expo's beauty partner. Accenture was the expo's Digital Services Premier Partner. Cisco was the expo's Official Premier Digital Network Partner. CNN was the official broadcaster for Dubai Expo 2020. DP World was the expo's Premier Global Trade Partner.

Developments

Economic
The Dubai Expo 2020 is associated with a rise in the UAE's GDP, as predicted by the International Monetary Fund.

Diplomatic
In November 2019, the UAE permitted Israeli passport holders to enter the country during Expo 2020. Israelis were allowed to have their own pavilion at the event and to even visit the country afterwards. In August 2020, the UAE and Israel agreed to fully normalize relations, superseding the previous agreement.

At the Expo 2020, the Emirati economy minister Abdulla bin Touq Al Marri, signed a deal with his Syrian counterpart, Mohammad Samer al-Khalil, with an aim of boosting trade between the two nations. Top officials from Bashar al-Assad’s regime attended the event. Syrian companies were also seen openly promoting their products at the Dubai Expo. It marked the little steps that the UAE was taking to move closer to Assad, who is shunned by majority of the world for his record of human rights abuses. Some Syrian companies also registered offshore entities in the UAE to conceal their origins and avoid the US and European sanctions. The Arab nation also assisted the Syrian importers to pay their international suppliers through Emirati accounts.

After the Russian invasion of Ukraine in February 2022, Expo 2020 said it would not block Russian participation in Expo 2020. Russia had a prominent pavilion at the event.

Impact of the COVID-19 pandemic

In 2020, the globally expanding COVID-19 pandemic brought Expo 2020 Dubai under scrutiny, as the event was expected to attract nearly 25 million visitors in October that year. In March, the Geneva Council for Rights and Liberties warned against the abuse and exploitation of migrant workers in the United Arab Emirates. While rest of the country was under a lockdown due to the spread of coronavirus, the migrants continued to work on Expo 2020. The Geneva Council condemned the “discriminatory treatment of migrant workers”, urging the WHO to encourage the UAE to ensure their health and safety.

On 25 March 2020, a staff member was tested positive.

On 30 March 2020, the expo indicated that it was investigating postponement of the world's fair, which would require a two thirds' majority agreement from a BIE annual general meeting. On 4 April 2020, the BIE announced that a meeting of the executive committee would take place virtually on 21 April to discuss a proposal to hold the expo between 1 October 2021 and 31 March 2022. A final decision would need a two thirds majority vote from BIE members.

On 21 April, the executive committee unanimously agreed to delay the expo until 1 October 2021 – 31 March 2022, with this then going to a remote vote of the general assembly. There is no proposal to change the name of the expo.

On 4 May 2020, the BIE announced that the threshold to agree a delay had been passed, although the vote was to open until 29 May. At 6pm Paris time, 29 May, the decision was confirmed, along with retention of the name Expo 2020 Dubai. New dates have been announced for 1 October 2021 – 31 March 2022.

On 15 September 2021, organizers announced that visitors to Expo 2020 will be required to present a proof of vaccination or a negative PCR test taken within the previous 72 hours.

World Chess Championship 
Due to the COVID-19 pandemic, the World Chess Championship 2021 was rescheduled to take place between 24 November 2021 and 16 December 2021 as part of Expo 2020 Dubai. The match was won by reigning World Chess Champion Magnus Carlsen of Norway, taking on challenger Ian Nepomniachtchi of Russia, who was victorious in the 2020–21 Candidates Tournament.

Criticism 
A month before Expo 2020, the European Parliament passed a resolution against the event, urging its member states and other nations to not participate. Citing the human rights records of the UAE, the EU also called for the international companies, who were sponsoring the event, to withdraw their sponsorship. The EU stated that the Emirati construction firms and businesses had been exploiting the rights of the migrant workers by forcing them to sign untranslated agreements, confiscating their passports, and leaving them to work for long hours and live in unsanitary conditions. The UAE rejected the resolution as "factually incorrect".

More than half of the 69 workers interviewed for a survey admitted paying recruitment fees in their home countries to acquire their positions. Many workers said their employers were aware of the practice but did nothing to stop it or repay the payments. Two-thirds of migrant workers polled said their wages or other benefits were not always paid on time or in full, leaving them unable to pay their bills or send money home to their families.

Human Rights Watch said any parties connected with the Expo should use the event to raise human rights abuses in the country. In a statement, Michael Page, deputy Middle East director at HRW, said: "Dozens of UAE peaceful domestic critics have been arrested, railroaded in blatantly unfair trials, and condemned to many years in prison simply for trying to express their ideas on governance and human rights." Page called the event "yet another opportunity for the UAE to falsely present itself on the world stage as open, tolerant, and rights-respecting while shutting down the space for politics, public discourse, and activism", and called on participating countries to "ensure that they are not helping the UAE whitewash its image and obscure its abuses".

As the UAE launched the World Expo Fair in October 2021, over two dozen human rights groups initiated an alternative expo online. The campaign was held to counter the Dubai Expo's targeted narrative of “tolerance” and “openness”. In the event, activists came together with poets, musicians, and visual artists from the Middle East to highlight the repression in the UAE and to stand in solidarity with the prisoners of conscience. The campaign also called for the release of human rights activists, including Ahmed Mansoor, Nasser bin Ghaith and three from the UAE-94: Mohammed al-Roken, Mohammed al-Mansoori and Mohammed Abdul Razzaq al-Siddiq.

The Emirati labor practices have been subject to criticism, resulting in Dubai authorities ensured to hold companies with fairly high standards of worker treatment for the event. Two months after the Expo 2020 commenced, human rights groups reported about the persisting violations. Migrant workers hired for the Expo 2020 were complaining about having to make exorbitant and illegal payments to local recruiters. Others complained of passport confiscation, broken promises on wages, unaffordable food, long working hours (sometimes in extremely hot weather), crowded, and unsanitary living conditions in dormitories. The human rights concerns and labor abuses at the Expo prompted the European Parliament to call for a boycott of the event.

Three workers died from construction accidents building the Expo and three from COVID-19.

In February 2022, a human rights and labor rights NGO called Equidem reported about the extensive abuse of migrant laborers being practiced by Emirati authorities at the Dubai Expo 2020. The allegations included charging illegal recruitment fees from the migrant workers, subjecting them to forced labor and racial discrimination, followed by delayed wages and confiscation of their passports. Those on the receiving end of the abuse were migrant laborers working as security guards, hospitality staff, cleaners, etc., at the Dubai Expo 2020. The report claimed that the UAE's failure at protecting migrant workers during the event not only risked the reputation of the participating countries and companies. The UAE and Expo 2020 authorities refrained from commenting despite multiple requests.

Bids and bidding
Once the first city had lodged a bid with the BIE, other cities had six months to respond. In early 2011, Izmir of Turkey and Ayutthaya of Thailand submitted bids to the BIE, initiating the six-month window for other cities to bid. When this window closed on 2 November 2011, there were five prospective cities, with Dubai making a last-minute entry. The BIE voted and selected the host city on 27 November 2013.

Five cities originally bid for the slot for a world's fair in 2020, with four remaining: Dubai, United Arab Emirates; Yekaterinburg, Russia; Izmir, Turkey; or São Paulo, Brazil. Expo 2020 will represent a first as a Middle Eastern destination will be hosting the event for the first time.

The following cities lodged bids to the BIE for hosting the 2020 EXPO:
  Izmir, Turkey
  Yekaterinburg, Russia
  São Paulo, Brazil
  Dubai, United Arab Emirates
São Paulo was eliminated from contention after the first round of votes. Izmir was knocked out in the second. Yekaterinburg lost to Dubai in the third and final round of voting.

Dubai Expo
The UAE selected the theme "Connecting Minds, Creating the Future" and the sub-themes Sustainability, Mobility and Opportunity.

On 27 November 2013, when Dubai won the right to host the Expo 2020, fireworks erupted at the world's tallest building, Burj Khalifa. A national holiday was declared the following day for all educational institutions across the country. The staging of the world fair and the preparations leading up to it are expected to result in 277,000 new jobs in the UAE, an injection of nearly $40 billion into the economy, and an increase in visitors of at least 25 million and up to 100 million. Jumeirah Lake Towers, was given the name "Burj 2020" in honour of the World Expo 2020.

Yekaterinburg Expo
The Russian bid The Global Mind would have run from 1 May to 31 October, and would have been the second-largest expo (after 2010 in Shanghai) and was intended to "survey world opinion through seven universal questions".

İzmir Expo
The Turkish bid had a theme of New Routes to a Better World / Health for All and would have run from 30 April to 31 October. A Health for All symposium was held in October 2013 for BIE delegates and was to discuss health issues across the world. Izmir had beat Ankara in securing government support for the bid.

São Paulo Expo
A Brazilian expo would have been called Power of Diversity, Harmony for Growth, run from 15 May to 15 November, and would have covered 502 hectares.

Other cities 
Other participating cities and countries that were not selected for the final voting process to host Expo 2020, or did not submit bids for consideration by the BIE:

 Ayutthaya was Thailand's official nomination to host Expo 2020. The province was chosen and approved as Thailand's bid city to host World Expo 2020 by the Thai cabinet as the Prime Minister, Abhisit Vejjajiva, announced during the Shanghai World Expo 2010. Ayutthaya brought a bid under the theme "Redefine Globalisation – Balanced Life, Sustainable Living" concept when bidding on behalf of Thailand to be the host country. However, Thailand's bid was disqualified by the Bureau of International Expositions because of concerns that the bid did not have sufficient government support.
 The United States has had several citizen efforts directed at bringing a World's Fair to the country. These efforts included the following cities:
 Houston – "Inspired Innovation"
 New York City – "Showcasing the World"
 San Francisco – "Interculture: Celebrating the World's Cultures while Creating New Ones through Interaction and Exchange"
 Las Vegas – "The future of my future," according to the Wall Street Journal
 Philippines did not bid for the Expo 2020 although Manila had been considered a possible contender under the theme "Manila, Celebrating Light and Life".
 Brisbane, Queensland, Australia also considered putting an official bid to host Expo 2020 but did not bid.
 Sydney, New South Wales, Australia had been quoted by media reports as another potential candidate for the Australian 2020 bid, but ultimately did not after losing the bid for the right to host Expo 2012.

Ticket prices
Three types of passes can be booked: daily passes, monthly passes and seasonal passes. The daily pass is applicable for one day only, costing AED 95. The monthly pass offers unrestricted entry for 30 consecutive days and costs AED 195. The seasonal pass offers unlimited entry for the entire six months of the Expo and costs AED 495. Entry is free for children below the age of 18, students holding valid ID cards of recognized academic institutions, and visitors aged 60 and above. Tickets are also free for people of determination (disabled people), with 50% off being offered for one caretaker. Tickets went on sale worldwide from 18 July 2021 at the Expo's official website expo2020dubai.com. For the last 50 days of Expo, a ticket was AED 50. Free admission was given to everyone on UAE National Day.

Stamps on Expo 2020 

Stamps on Expo 2020 issued by postal administrations

Postcard on Expo 2020 

Postcard on Expo 2020 issued by postal administrations

Expo City Dubai

After the six-month-long running of Expo 2020, the site used for the fair will become part of a 3,000,000 square meter development called Expo City Dubai. Earlier branded as District 2020, Expo City Dubai is designed to be a "15-minute city" and will include 200,000 sq m of commercial and residential spaces with buildings like the Al Wasl Dome being retained in the district's design. Abiding by the rule of sustainability, Terra - The Sustainability Pavilion will become a children and science centre, while Alif - The Mobility Pavilion will become an office building. Mission Possible - The Opportunity Pavilion will be rebuilt as the Expo 2020 Museum and the UAE Pavilion will become the UAE's cultural centre. Only some of the most popular pavilions like those of India, Egypt and Saudi Arabia will remain as it is. The Water Feature and Garden in the Sky attractions are set to remain. Two hospitals, a school, and 200,000 square meters of office space will be added. The district will be well-connected to the rest of the city and country by road and is located near the Al Maktoum International Airport. The Expo 2020 metro station, located next to the Al Wasl Gate, will be renamed as Expo City Metro Station in the future. The ROVE Hotel will also stay.

In 2022, Sheikh Mohammed bin Rashid Al Maktoum, PM and VP of the UAE and Ruler of Dubai, announced the new plan for District 2020 as Expo City Dubai. Later that year, Sheikh Mohamed bin Zayed Al Nahyan, the President of the UAE, announced that the COP28 Climate Summit will be held in Expo City Dubai. The development opened on October 1, 2022.

Ahead of the official opening of the Expo City, visitors will be able to visit the Alif Pavilion – The Mobility Pavilion, and Terra Pavilion – The Sustainability Pavilion, as early as September 1. Expo City Dubai will also feature an education program where students can participate in a number of experiences, exhibits and interactive workshops. The tickets for the Alif and Terra pavilions cost AED 50 per person.

Fates of the pavilions and attractions 
: Remained the same.
: Removed. Monument will be marked on original site.
Alif - The Mobility: Became an office building.
: Remained the same.
: Remained the same.
: Remained the same.
: Removed. Monument will be marked on original site.
: Remained the same.
: Dismantled. Monument will be marked on original site.
: Removed. Monument will be marked on original site.
: Renovation. Monument will be marked on original site.
: Removed. Monument will be marked on original site.
: Removed. Monument will be marked on original site.
: Removed. Monument will be marked on original site.
: Removed. Monument will be marked on original site.
: Removed. Monument will be marked on original site.
: Remained the same.
: Renovation. Monument will be marked on original site.
: Remained the same.
: Remained the same.
: Remained the same.
Fan Club: Remained the same.
: Remained the same.
: Removed and relocated to Toulouse. Monument will be marked on the original site. 
Garden in the Sky: Remained the same.
: Removed. Monument will be marked on original site.
: Removed. Monument will be marked on original site.
: Remained the same.
: Removed. Monument will be marked on original site.
: Removed. Monument will be marked on original site.
: Renovation. Monument will be marked on original site.
: Renovation. Monument will be marked on original site.
: Removed. Monument will be marked on original site.
: Removed. Monument will be marked on original site.
: Removed. Monument will be marked on original site.
: Remained the same.
: Removed. Monument will be marked on original site.
: Remained the same.
: Renovation. Monument will be marked on original site.
: Removed. Monument will be marked on original site.
: Remained the same.
: Became the Aerodyne Group's Dubai office.
: Remained the same.
Mission Possible – The Opportunity: Became the Expo 2020 Museum.
: Removed. Monument will be marked on original site.
: Remained the same.
: Dismantled in order for the raw materials to be used for other construction projects in the UAE. Removed. Monument will be marked on original site.
: Removed. Monument will be marked on original site.
: Remained the same.
: Renovation. Remained the same.
: Remained the same.
: Remained the same.
: Remained the same.
: Dismantled. Monument will be marked on original site.
: Dismantled. Monument will be marked on original site.
: Remained the same.
: Remained the same.
: Removed. Monument will be marked on original site.
: Became the Stories Of Nation's - Sustainability
: Remained the same.
: Remained the same.
: Removed. Monument will be marked on original site.
: Removed. Monument will be marked on original site.
: Renovation. Monument will be marked on original site.
: Renovation. Monument will be marked on original site.
: Removed. Monument will be marked on original site.
: Renovation. Monument will be marked on original site.
: Removed. Monument will be marked on original site.
Terra - The Sustainability: Became a children's and science centre.
: Removed. Monument will be marked on original site.
: Remained the same.
: Remained the same.
: Became a cultural centre.
: Removed. Monument will be marked on original site.
: Removed. Monument will be marked on original site.
: Remained the same.
: Remained the same.
: Remained the same.
Vision Pavilion: Remained the same.
Water Feature: Remained the same.
Women's Pavilion: Remained the same.

See also
 Expo 2020 (Dubai Metro)

References

External links
 
 
 Virtual online Expo 2020

 
2021 festivals
2022 festivals
Events in Dubai
World's fairs in Asia
2020s in Dubai
2021 in the United Arab Emirates
2022 in the United Arab Emirates
Events postponed due to the COVID-19 pandemic
Historical events in the United Arab Emirates
Events affected by the 2022 Russian invasion of Ukraine